JA21 (backronym for Juiste Antwoord 2021,  or 'Right Answer 2021') is a political party in the Netherlands, currently active in the Senate as the Nanninga Group. It was founded in December 2020 by Joost Eerdmans and Annabel Nanninga after leaving Forum for Democracy on 26 November 2020. The party participated in the general election on 17 March 2021.

History 

JA21 was founded on 18 December 2020 by Eerdmans and Nanninga, after they had left Forum for Democracy following an internal dispute over the party leadership's response to allegations of racism, antisemitism and homophobia against its youth wing (including glorification of Anders Breivik and Brenton Tarrant), and controversial statements made by party leader Thierry Baudet. JA21 describes itself as a "proper" right-wing party and aims to fill the gap between the centre-right People's Party for Freedom and Democracy (VVD) and the more radical-right Party for Freedom (PVV). Party leader Joost Eerdmans had previously been a member of parliament for the Pim Fortuyn List and served as deputy mayor of Rotterdam.

According to Eerdmans, the name JA21 does not only refer to the first names of himself and Nanninga; it also stands for the 'Right Answer/Correct Answer' (het 'Juiste Antwoord') and 'Your Alternative' ('Jouw Alternatief').

On 20 December 2020, ex-Forum for Democracy MEPs Derk Jan Eppink, Rob Roos and Rob Rooken announced that they had become members of JA21. Two days later, the independent Senate group Fractie-Van Pareren – consisting of seven ex-Forum for Democracy senators – joined JA21, making it the fourth largest party in the Senate.

On 16 January 2021, the provincial group of Forum for Democracy in North Brabant split, with three members leaving Forum for Democracy to form the JA21 parliamentary group in the Provincial Council of North Brabant. As Forum for Democracy was part of the province's coalition government at the time of the split, the new JA21 parliamentary group immediately entered the coalition after talks with the other coalition members. This marked the first time that JA21 entered a coalition with other parties.

Ideology 
In its platform, JA21 describes itself as both liberal and conservative with an emphasis on personal freedom, political transparency and reliable government. Initially, JA21 sought to emulate the original political platform of the Forum for Democracy party from which it split. Both political observers and the party's leadership have also referred to JA21 as being more influenced by Fortuynism, the ideology espoused by assassinated Dutch politician Pim Fortuyn and his Pim Fortuyn List (LPF) party. Party leader Joost Eerdmans, himself a former LPF member of parliament, has claimed that he wants JA21 to help "Fortuyn's ideas return to the House of Representatives."

JA21 states that it stands for "less regulatory burden, tax relief, a strict immigration policy and support for the entrepreneurs who make our country great". The party is strongly opposed to further integration within the European Union and the EU becoming a Federal Superstate. JA21 wants to strengthen the Netherlands' autonomy by ending influence of the EU on domestic affairs by putting "Dutch interests first" and supporting the right to national self-determination. It also supports a referendum on Dutch membership of the Eurozone, a revision of Dutch membership of EU treaties and the Schengen Agreement, and a renegotiation of Dutch membership of the EU. JA21 is also opposed to the potential accession of Turkey to the European Union. The party also wants to opt out of the EU asylum pact, regain full control over Dutch borders and expel illegal immigrants. JA21 also opposes cuts to the police budget and calls for tougher prison sentences against those who attack emergency workers and repeatedly offend. It also calls for compulsory measures for immigrants to learn Dutch, wants an end to foreign funding of mosques and Islamic schools, and states that people with dual nationality should be stripped of their Dutch citizenship if they join a foreign terrorist group. The party also supports foreign investment and maintaining free trade agreements with other nations in order to stem flows of migration and wants good relations with the United Kingdom following Brexit. JA21 also supports internet freedom and wants to protect the right to online privacy by preventing the government and big tech companies from mining personal data or breaching privacy laws. In terms of culture, the party has expressed opposition to modern architecture and supports restoring historic buildings to their original specifications. In 2022, JA21 campaigned against "de-colonisation" of Dutch history, instead arguing for the protection of national cultural heritage and for free museum admission for Dutch nationals. 

On its website, JA21 lists its beliefs as:
 Immigration: in favor of a stricter immigration policy and a zero tolerance stance on illegal immigration
 Democracy: in favor of giving more power to the electorate through binding referendums
 Pensions: against EU control over Dutch pensions
 Security: in favor of a strong army and police, and a zero-tolerance policy for extremism
 European Union: Dutch interests first, against the transfer of resources from Northern to Southern Europe; against Eurofederalism
 Health care: in favor of putting the interests of patients before the interests of health insurers
Income: in favor of tax and welfare system reforms to create incentives to work
 Media and culture: in favor of depoliticizing the Dutch public broadcasting system, and more money for cultural heritage
 Education: against ideological homogeneity and identity politics in schools
Entrepreneurship: in favor of support for small businesses; against government deals with multinational corporations
Climate: against costly climate laws and agreements
 COVID-19 pandemic: in favor of science-based policy, for public health and the economy
Culture and identity: oppose de-colonisation of Dutch history and education and preserve national heritage

Representation

Members of the House of Representatives 
 Joost Eerdmans, parliamentary leader
 Derk Jan Eppink
 Nicki Pouw-Verweij

Members of the Senate 
 Annabel Nanninga, parliamentary leader
 Hugo Berkhout
 Toine Beukering
 Otto Hermans
 Lennart van der Linden
 Bob van Pareren
 Loek van Wely

Members of the European Parliament 
 Rob Roos, head of delegation
 Michiel Hoogeveen
 Rob Rooken

Members of the States Provincial

Electoral results

House of Representatives

See also 
 Otten Group
 Belang van Nederland
 Pim Fortuyn List

Notes

References

External links 
 

Conservative parties in the Netherlands
Liberal parties in the Netherlands
Political parties established in 2020
2020 establishments in the Netherlands
Eurosceptic parties in the Netherlands
Organisations based in Amsterdam